Alamada, officially the Municipality of Alamada (Maguindanaon: Inged nu Alamada, Jawi: ايڠايد نو عالماد; Iranun: Inged a Alamada, ايڠايد ا عالماد; ;), is a 1st class municipality in the province of Cotabato, Philippines. According to the 2020 census, it has a population of 68,659 people.

The town is named after the local chieftain Datu Alamada, and is famous for the Asik-asik Falls, one of the most expansive in the Philippines.

History

Its name was adopted in memory and in honor of the powerful ruler Datu Amaybulok Alamada. He was the leader who fought against the foreign oppression and tyranny. The Datu was recognized as one of the fiery rulers by the Iranon and the Dalaman who were scattered throughout the northern part of the Municipalities of Pigcauayan, Libungan, Sultan Kudarat and in Kitacubong (now Poblacion) as the seat of his kingdom.

Prior to its creation as a municipality, it was a resettlement area for Hukbalahap (Hukbong Bayan Laban sa Hapon) surrenders. It was also a public land as declared by then President Elpidio Quirino on March 10, 1953. It was declared as resettlement site under Proclamation No. 376. After its declaration, President Quirino designated the Armed Forces of the Philippines (AFP) to implement the “Land for the Landless Program.”

On January 1, 1954, the area was named Genio Edcor, pursuant to section 3 of General Order No. 409 GHQ., AFP; the name was in honor of then M/SGT. Regino Genio who was ambushed in 1953 at Perido Edcor Farm in Angadanan, Isabela, by the “Hukbong Magpapalaya ng Bayan sa Hapon.” From January 1, 1954, to August 6, 1961, Genio Edcor was a political subdivision by the Municipality of Midsayap. Samson B. Buenafe, a bona fide settler of Genio Edcor, represented the area in the Municipal Council of Midsayap.

During the nationwide reorganization in 1986, the first mayor in the name of Wenceslao Tabar Dela Cerna was brought by the EDSA revolution.  President Corazon C. Aquino on her first term, replaced the incumbent leaders, especially Marcos’ supporters by the Officer-in-Charge. From March 1986 to November 1987,  Jesus N. Sacdalan served as the first OIC.  Mayor Wenceslao Tabar Dela Cerna was brought back in the 1988 election and served until 1992.a

Possible isolation due to future establishment of Bangsamoro
During the 2001 Referendum for inclusion to the Autonomous Region in Muslim Mindanao, two (2) out of twenty-eight (28) barangays of Carmen, Cotabato chose to be part of ARMM, but were excluded because they are not connected to the main region of ARMM. During 2010-2016 Administration, the Bangsamoro ideal sprouted and a newly proposed region was in the making. According to the agreements signed by the Moro Islamic Liberation Front and the Administration of Noynoy Aquino, Carmen will be included in Bangsamoro because of the two out of twenty-eight barangays that voted in favor of joining the Muslim region back in 2001. Unfortunately, Bangsamoro was not implemented before the term of Aquino ended. Despite this, the current administration aims to establish a Federal Government, where Bangamoro will be realized into a State of the Philippines wherein Carmen will be included in Bangsamoro.

Plans to establish a new municipality in the south of Carmen so that the indigenous and Christian central and northern part of Carmen will be retained in North Cotabato has yet to be confirmed. The idea arose because once the entire municipality of Carmen is included in Bangsamoro, the province of North Cotabato will be cut into half, leaving three towns (Banisilan, Alamada, and Libungan) at its west without connection to the center of North Cotabato, isolating these towns in the process.

Geography
The Municipality of Alamada is bounded on the north by the Province of Lanao del Sur, on the south by the Municipality of Libungan, on the east by the Municipality of Banisilan and on the west by the Municipality of Pigcawayan and Buldon of Maguindanao Province. The 78,750 hectares of land area is distributed over 17 barangay. Generally, Alamada is highly elevated and its characterized by rolling, hilly and undulating terrain.

Barangays
Alamada is politically subdivided into 17 barangays.

Climate

The municipality belongs to the fourth type of climate. Rainfall is evenly throughout the year except on the months of May and September.

Demographics

Economy 

Alamada is basically agricultural as its land is cultivated for corn, upland rice, bananas, palm oil, and rubber. Thus its people activities are devoted to agriculture. A corn producing municipality. Livestock and poultry production is also another agricultural activities.

Natural resources
Its agricultural products are corn, coconuts, rice, banana, carrots, Yukon Gold potato, mango and other crops, minerals are also found in the areas such as manganese.

Tourism

 Asik-asik Falls is located at Sitio Dulao, Upper Dado, Alamada, Cotabato. The water comes from the rocks, instead of a stream.
 Daday Falls, Upper Dado, Alamada, Cotabato. This is the highest and biggest waterfalls in the municipality, and it is located just few kilameters from the Asik-asik falls.
 Guo Hill View Deck is located between Barangay Rangayen and Barangay Guiling.
 Kitub-Bao Cave located at Kitub-Bao, Alamada. It has one entrance but 3 exit points, underground water, swallow birds, bats and other unknown insects could be found inside the cave.
 Mt. Opao located at Kitub-Bao, Alamada, specifically between the boundaries of Alamada and Banisilan. It is blessed with natural grown trees and source of cold spring water.
 Shrine of the Holy Cross of Siya-siya located at Siya-siya, Bao, Alamada.

References

External links

 Alamada Profile at the DTI Cities and Municipalities Competitive Index
 [ Philippine Standard Geographic Code]
Philippine Census Information

Municipalities of Cotabato